Stamford Hill is a London Overground station on the Lea Valley Lines, serving Stamford Hill and neighbouring areas. Its three-letter station code is SMH and it is in Travelcard zone 3.

The entrance hall to the station, on Amhurst Park, lies within the London Borough of Hackney but much of the platform area is in the London Borough of Haringey. The station is on the Seven Sisters branch of the Lea Valley lines, with trains out of Liverpool Street running to either Cheshunt or Enfield Town.

Services
Trains are operated by London Overground.

The typical off-peak weekday service pattern from Stamford Hill is:

Connections
London Buses routes 253, 254 and night route N253 serve the station.

References

External links

Railway stations in the London Borough of Hackney
Former Great Eastern Railway stations
Railway stations in Great Britain opened in 1872
Stamford Hill
Railway stations served by London Overground